Nur Mahmudi Ismail (born November 11, 1961 in Kediri) was the Mayor of Depok City, a satellite city of West Java located in the southern part of Jakarta.

Political career
Ismail was the first chairman of Prosperous Justice Party (formerly Justice Party), when the party was created in 1998. Later, after the 1999 general election, Ismail resigned from his position as the chairman of the party after being chosen by President Abdurrahman Wahid to serve as the minister of forestry in the National Unity Cabinet. He held this position from 1999 to 2000, when President Wahid replaced him with Marzuki Usman.

Mayor
In 2005, together with his running mate, Yuyun Wirasaputra, Ismail narrowly won the mayoral election, beating the incumbent Badrul Kamal.

References 

Living people
1961 births
Mayors and regents of places in West Java
People from Depok
People from Kediri (city)
Bogor Agricultural University alumni
Government ministers of Indonesia
Prosperous Justice Party politicians
Javanese people
Mayors of places in Indonesia